Pat Duffy (born January 17, 1975) is a goofy-footed professional skateboarder, and is widely recognized among skateboarders for his  handrail skateboarding.

He has appeared in numerous skateboarding videos, as well as the video games Skate, Skate 2 and Skate 3.

Skateboarding
Duffy was sponsored by the Vox skate footwear brand, with whom he released the "Patriot" signature shoe model in early June 2014. In a press release issued on July 14, 2014, the shoe company In California Inc. (owner of the AirSpeed Footwear brand) announced that Duffy had joined the company's team, along with Brian Sumner and Kristian Svitak.

Sponsors
In a tweet on August 1, 2014, Duffy announced that he was sponsored by Plan B Skateboards, Lost Clothing, FKD Bearings, Orion Trucks, Paradox Griptape, Airspeed Footwear, Vivo, Arnette, Bony Acai, and Pacific Drive.

Videography
Duffy is particularly known for his roles in the Plan B Skateboards videos Questionable (1992) and "Virtual Reality" (1993), and earned recognition for his ability to skateboard handrails.

Along with team members PJ Ladd, Ryan Sheckler, Torey Pudwill, Danny Way and Colin McKay, Duffy is scheduled to appear in the Plan B video True, which is expected to be released in late 2014.

Duffy's skateboarding has also been featured in the following skate videos:
 Plan B - Questionable in 1992
 Plan B - Virtual Reality in 1993
 Plan B - Second Hand Smoke in 1994
 XYZ - Meet Your Maker in 1995
 Deluxe - Jim's Ramp Jam in 1996
 Plan B - The Revolution in 1997
 Consolidated - No Tomorrow in 1998
 Think - Dedication in 1998
 Digital - #1 in 1999
 ON Video - Fall 2000 in 2000
 Think - Free At Last Vol. 1 in 2002
 Transworld - Are You Alright? in 2003
 Transworld - Subtleties in 2004
 Firsthand: Pat Duffy in 2006
 Plan B - Live After Death in 2006
 Minority Report in 2006
 Thrasher - Keg Killer in 2006
 Streets: LA in 2007
 Plan B In Dominican Republic in 2008
 Plan B - Superfuture in 2008
 Plan B In Arizona in 2009
 FKD - Park Project Finale in 2010
 VOX - Skate 4 Change: Volume 1 in 2011
 Plan B - Code in 2022

References

External links
Plan B Skateboards profile page
AirSpeed Footwear profile page

Living people
American skateboarders
1975 births
People from Corte Madera, California